is a Japanese voice actor and part of 81 Produce.

Filmography

Anime
Goldfish Warning! (1991) (Koucho-sensei)
PaRappa the Rapper (2001) (middle-aged man)
.hack//Legend of the Twilight Bracelet (2003) (Fighting Bones)
Naruto (2003) (Komaza, Misumi Tsurugi)
Princess Tutu (2003) (Rue's father)
Mukuro Naru Hoshi Tama Taru Ko (2003) (police officer, voice on the radio)
Transformers: Armada (2003) (Misfire)
Burst Angel (2004) (operator)
Cromartie High School (2004) (badass B)
Koi Kaze (2004) (teacher)
Maria-sama ga Miteru (2004) (headmaster)
Rozen Maiden (2004) (delivery man)
Ah! My Goddess (2005) (customer)
Eureka Seven (2005) (guard C)
Gakuen Alice (2005) (Reo's subordinate)
Ginban Kaleidoscope (2005) (Ueda)
Glass Mask (2005) (President Oozawa)
Guyver: The Bioboosted Armor (2005) (Dr. Shirai, Myumelzee, Thancrus)
Hell Girl (2005) (Ebisu-sensei)
Kamichu! (2005) (newscaster)
Tsubasa: Reservoir Chronicle (2005) (Oyaji-san)
009-1 (2006) (various minor roles)
Ah! My Goddess: Flights of Fancy (2006) (various minor roles)
Buso Renkin (2006) (student)
Eureka Seven (2006) (customer A)
Ginga Densetsu Weed (2006) (Shirozaku, Stone)
Gintama (2006) (doctor)
Hell Girl (2006) (Ai's father, Pierrot)
Hell Girl: Two Mirrors (2006) (vice principal)
Idaten Jump (2006) (Tasuku)
Innocent Venus (2006) (soldier)
Night Head Genesis (2006) (doctor, master)
Wan Wan Serebu Soreyuke! Tetsunoshin (2006) (Doushin Onizuka, Sasuke)
Baccano! (2007) (Nick)
Bamboo Blade (2007) (vice principal)
Claymore (2007) (Yoma in Great Chapel)
D.Gray-man (2007) (Momo)
Hayate the Combat Butler (2007) (announcer)
Shining Tears X Wind (2007) (Kouryuu)
The Story of Saiunkoku (2007) (Koyo)
Toward the Terra (2007) (Harold, Pascal Wogg)
Golgo 13 (2008) (Bob)
Naruto Shippuden (2010) (Omoi)
Appleseed XIII (2011) (Eris Embassy chief)
Ixion Saga DT (2012) (Sebastian)
Kids on the Slope (2012) (Sentaro's father)
Durarara!!×2 Shō (2015) (Fukumi)
Joker Game (2016) (Otto Frank)
The King of Fighters: Destiny (2017) (Kim Kaphwan)
Yuru Camp (2018) (Oomachi)
Dorohedoro (2020) (Tanabe)
Boruto: Naruto Next Generations (2020) (Omoi)
Back Arrow (2021) (Burk Lean)

Unknown date
MÄR (Bols)
Mirmo Zibang! (hospice teacher)
Tokimeki Memorial Only Love (vice headmaster)

Tokusatsu
K-tai Investigator 7 (xxxx) (Phone Braver 7)
Juken Sentai Gekiranger (2007) (Rasuka)
Heisei Riders vs. Shōwa Riders: Kamen Rider Taisen feat. Super Sentai (2014)
Ressha Sentai ToQger (2015) (Dollhouse Shadow ep.43)
Super Hero Taisen GP: Kamen Rider 3 (2015) - Kamen Rider 2

Films
Hokuto no Ken: Shin Kyūseishu Densetsu series (xxxx-xx) (young Raoh)
Pokémon: Lucario and the Mystery of Mew (2005) (Regice)
Loups=Garous (2010) (Touji Kunugi)
Pretty Cure Dream Stars (2017) (Karasu Tengu)

Video games
Berserk Musou (xxxx) (Wyald)
Shadow Hearts: From the New World (xxxx) (Johnny Garland)
Atelier Iris: Eternal Mana 2 (xxxx) (Maximillian)
Atelier Iris: Grand Fantasm (xxxx) (Crowley)
Hokuto no Ken: Shinpan no Sōsōsei Kengō Retsuden (xxxx) (Kenshiro)
 Epic Mickey 2: The Power of Two (2012) (Oswald the Lucky Rabbit)
The King of Fighters All Star (2018) (Kim Kaphwan)
Kingdom Hearts III (2019) (Gopher)

Drama CDs
Mix Mix Chocolate (xxxx) (Student Council President)

Dubbing

Live-action
Another Earth (Jeff Williams (Robin Lord Taylor))
The Asian Connection (Niran)
Assassination Games (Nalbandian)
Aquaman (Dr. Stephen Shin (Randall Park))
Broken Embraces (Ray X / Ernesto Martel, Jr. (Rubén Ochandiano))
Dumbo (Ivan the Wonderful)
Gone (Lt. Ray Bozeman (Michael Paré))
House of Cards (Douglas "Doug" Stamper (Michael Kelly), Lucas Goodwin (Sebastian Arcelus))
Infestation (Hugo)
Joker (Comedian (Gary Gulman))
The Last Stand (Agent Phil Hayes (Daniel Henney))
Mad Max: Fury Road (Morsov (Chris Patton))
Rambo: Last Blood (2022 BS Tokyo edition) (Don Manuel (Joaquín Cosío))
The Social Network (Prince Albert (James Shanklin))
Step Up 3D (Jacob)
The Wailing (Oh Seong-bok)
Woodlawn (Hank Erwin (Sean Astin), Paul Bryant (Jon Voight))

Animation
Atomic Betty (Minimus P.U.)
The Batman (Firefly / Garfield Lynns)
Batman: The Brave and the Bold (Firefly / Garfield Lynns)
Camp Lazlo (Lazlo)
The Good Dinosaur (Coldfront)
Jimmy Two-Shoes (Beezy)
Pet Alien (Flip)
Phineas and Ferb (Albert)
Pickle and Peanut (Mr. Mjärt, Champion Horse)
Planes (Sparky)
Planes: Fire & Rescue (Sparky)
Pucca (Abyo)
Rocko's Modern Life: Static Cling (Rocko)
Shirt Tales (Buzzy from "The Terrible Termites")
Skylanders Academy (Jet-Vac and Crash Bandicoot (episodes 10 and 11))
Teenage Mutant Ninja Turtles (Zed)
Teen Titans (Gnaark, Brain)
Thomas & Friends (Connor, Axel, Dart, Paxton, Norman (replacing Nobuaki Kanemitsu), Ivan, The Third Slip Coach, Yin-Long, Toad (succeeding Yūsuke Numata) and Rocky)
Tinker Bell (Clank)
Zootopia (Manchas)

References

External links
 
81 Produce

1975 births
Japanese male video game actors
Japanese male voice actors
Male voice actors from Yamaguchi Prefecture
Living people
81 Produce voice actors
20th-century Japanese male actors
21st-century Japanese male actors